Nina Keogh is a Canadian puppet builder, voice actress and puppeteer. She is a former member of the Academy of Canadian Cinema and Television, Canadian Actors' Equity Association, UDA, and is an ACTRA member since 1968. She was on the board of directors for ACTRA and the Children's Broadcast Institute. She has worked for TVO and CBC Television. She is best-known for playing the role of Muffy the Mouse in TVO's 1981-87 TV series Today's Special, which was shown worldwide including on Nickelodeon in the United States. Her father, John Keogh, played Howard the Turtle in Razzle Dazzle. Keogh retired from the television business in 1999 to become a professional painter.

She is a former instructor at Fleming College (Haliburton School of the Arts) in Haliburton.

Works
 Drop-In 1970 and 1971 host
 Polka Dot Door 1971 and 1972 host
 TVO's. Whatever Turns You On 1973 host
 Readalong 1976
 Today's Special 1981-87 (Muffy)
 The Friendly Giant 1982
 Téléfrançais! 1984-1986
 The Magic Library 1989
 Bookmice 1991 (Norbert)
 Mr. Dressup 1992
 The Santa Clause 1994
 Hello Mrs. Cherrywinkle 1996
 Groundling Marsh 1997 (Crystal)
 Sesame Park 1998

References

External links

 
 Official website

Place of birth missing (living people)
Living people
Canadian television actresses
Canadian voice actresses
Canadian puppeteers
Year of birth missing (living people)